Strike It Rich is a 1948 American comedy film directed by Lesley Selander and starring Rod Cameron, Bonita Granville and Don Castle.

It was partly shot on location around Lindale, Texas.

Cast
 Rod Cameron as Duke Massey 
 Bonita Granville as Julie Ann Brady 
 Don Castle as William 'Tex' Warren 
 Stuart Erwin as Delbart Lane 
 Lloyd Corrigan as Matt Brady 
 Ellen Corby as Mrs. Annie Harkins 
 Emory Parnell as Carlton 
 Harry Tyler as 'Pop' Jonathan 
 Virginia Dale as Mabel 
 William Haade as Bull 
 Edward Gargan as Mack - the Bartender 
 Robert Dudley as Pop - the Postmaster

References

Bibliography
 Martin, Len D. The Allied Artists Checklist: The Feature Films and Short Subjects of Allied Artists Pictures Corporation, 1947-1978. McFarland & Company, 1993.
 Stephens, Michael L. Art Directors in Cinema: A Worldwide Biographical Dictionary. McFarland, 1998.

External links
 

1948 films
1948 comedy films
1940s English-language films
American comedy films
Films directed by Lesley Selander
Allied Artists films
Films shot in Texas
American black-and-white films
1940s American films